Madhab Spring Park (aka Madhab Sulpheric Spring Park) is a park, mineral spring, and tourist attraction located close to Fujairah Heritage Village, northwest of Fujairah City, Emirate of Fujairah, United Arab Emirates (UAE).

The park is located under the foothills of the Hajar Mountains, inland of Fujairah City. It has grass and trees, under which it is possible to picnic. The source of the mineral spring is on the edge of the park, feeding two swimming pools. The park is open daily. The park covers 39,000 square metres and was upgraded in 2016.

See also
 Madhab Palace

References

Year of establishment missing
Tourist attractions in the United Arab Emirates
Parks in the United Arab Emirates
Springs of the United Arab Emirates
Spas
Geography of the Emirate of Fujairah
Fujairah City